Falling Leaves is a 1924 play by the British writer Sutton Vane. It features a love triangle between three characters.

It premiered at the Pleasure Gardens Theatre in Folkestone before transferring to the Little Theatre in the West End where it ran for 15 performances, failing to recapture the success of his play of the previous year Outward Bound despite the fact it starred Diana Hamilton who had also appeared in the earlier hit. The cast also included Allan Jeayes and Frank Vosper

References

Bibliography
 Wearing, J. P. The London Stage 1920-1929: A Calendar of Productions, Performers, and Personnel. Rowman & Littlefield, 2014.

1924 plays
Plays by Sutton Vane